Gribouille (English title: Heart of Paris or The Meddler) is a 1937 French comedy film directed by Marc Allégret, based on story "Gribouille" by Marcel Achard who co-wrote the screenplay with . The music score is by Georges Auric. The film stars Raimu and Michèle Morgan. It was shot at the Billancourt Studios in Paris, with sets designed by the art director Alexandre Trauner.

It was remade in the U.S. as The Lady in Question (1940) with  Brian Aherne, Rita Hayworth and Glenn Ford.

The film marked Michèle Morgan's first major role on the big screen.

Plot
Camille Morestan serves as a jury member at a court in Paris. The attractive Natalie Roguin is accused of murder. Morestan doesn't want to believe she really killed her lover. He succeeds in convincing the other jury members she was innocent. After her acquittal he takes her into his house. While he tries to keep her identity a secret for his family her presence leads to a number of unfortunate incidents.

Cast
 Raimu as Camille Morestan 
 Michèle Morgan as Natalie Roguin 
 Gilbert Gil as Claude Morestan 
 Jean Worms as the president 
 Julien Carette as Lurette 
 Marcel André as state attorney general 
 Jacques Grétillat as the defender
 Jacques Baumer as  Marinier 
 René Bergeron as Kuhlmann
 Jeanne Provost as Louise Morestan
 Nicolas Rimsky as taxi driver

References

External links
Gribouille at Films de France

French comedy films
French black-and-white films
Films directed by Marc Allégret
1937 films
Films scored by Georges Auric
1937 comedy films
Films shot at Billancourt Studios
1930s French-language films
1930s French films